The Frank Nelson Cole Prize, or Cole Prize for short, is one of twenty-two prizes awarded to mathematicians by the American Mathematical Society, one for an outstanding contribution to algebra, and the other for an outstanding contribution to number theory.  The prize is named after Frank Nelson Cole, who served the Society for 25 years. The Cole Prize in algebra was funded by Cole himself, from funds given to him as a retirement gift; the prize fund was later augmented by his son, leading to the double award.

To be eligible for the Cole prize, the author must be a member of the American Mathematical Society or the paper should appear in a recognized North American journal.  The first award for algebra was made in 1928 to L. E. Dickson, while the first award for number theory was made in 1931 to H. S. Vandiver.

Frank Nelson Cole Prize in Algebra

Frank Nelson Cole Prize in Number Theory

For full citations, see external links.

See also

 List of mathematics awards

References

External links
Frank Nelson Cole Prize in Algebra
Frank Nelson Cole Prize in Number Theory

Awards of the American Mathematical Society
Awards established in 1928
Triennial events
.
1928 establishments in the United States